Amah Rock (Mong Fu Shek,  "husband-watching stone") is a naturally shaped rock located on a hilltop in southwest Sha Tin District, Hong Kong.

Description
The rock is approximately 15 meters in height, and is shaped much like a woman carrying a baby on her back. It stands above the entrance to the Lion Rock Tunnel, within Lion Rock Country Park.

Legend
According to a legend, the faithful wife of a fisherman climbed the hills every day, carrying her son, to watch for the return of her husband, not knowing he had been drowned at sea. In reward for her faithfulness she was turned into a rock by the Goddess of the Sea so that her spirit could unite with that of her husband. Similar legends abound throughout the whole of China—the number of rocks called Mong Fu Shek in the country is high. Many Chinese classical poems were dedicated to this kind of rock.

Attraction
The rock is a popular tourist destination; the whole Sha Tin District can be seen from there. It is also a place of worship for Chinese women and stands as a symbol of women's loyalty and faithfulness.

See also
 Amah (occupation)
 Lion Rock
 Tao Fong Shan
 List of places in Hong Kong

References

External links

Pictures of Amah Rock (Archived 2009-10-25)

Mountains, peaks and hills of Hong Kong
Sha Tin District
Rock formations of China
Cantonese folklore